Christopher Tellefsen (born 1957) is an American film editor.

In 2012, he was nominated for an Academy Award for his work on the film Moneyball.

Select filmography
1986 - The Color of Money
1987 - My Demon Lover
1989 - Cookie
1990 - Metropolitan
1991 - Jumpin' at the Boneyard
1993 - Darkness in Tallinn
1994 - Barcelona
1995 - Kids
1995 - Smoke
1995 - Blue in the Face
1996 - Flirting with Disaster
1996 - The People vs. Larry Flynt
1997 - Gummo
1997 - Chinese Box
1998 - Legionnaire
1999 - Analyze This
1999 - Man on the Moon
2001 - Birthday Girl
2002 - Changing Lanes
2003 - The Human Stain
2004 - The Village
2005 - Capote
2006 - A Guide to Recognizing Your Saints
2007 - Perfect Stranger
2008 - The Yellow Handkerchief
2009 - The Rebound
2010 - Fair Game
2011 - Moneyball
2014 - Lambert & Stamp (Documentary)
2014 - The Drop
2015 - True Story
2015 - Joy
2016 - Blood Father
2016 - Assassin's Creed
2018 - A Quiet Place
2018 - Widows
2019 - Light of My Life
2019 - The Kitchen
2021 - The Many Saints of Newark
2022 - The Menu

References

External links

Living people
1957 births
Place of birth missing (living people)
American film editors